Kelsey Bahiyyih Bulkin (born March 25, 1985 in Encinitas, California) is a singer and musician based in Los Angeles, California formerly based in Oakland, California. She is best known for her work as singer and songwriter of duo Made in Heights alongside producer Sabzi.

From 2010 to 2015, Made in Heights released two full-length albums, headlined a U.S. tour, performed at major music festivals such as Outside Lands, Electric Forest Festival, and Lightning in a Bottle, and saw critical praise from outlets such as The Fader, Vice, Complex, Consequence of Sound, KCRW, and The Atlantic.

Kelsey is the niece of American songwriter, record producer, and recording artist Mark Spiro.

Discography

Made in Heights – Made in Heights (2012, self-released)

Made in Heights – Without My Enemy What Would I Do (2015, self-released)

Kelsey Bulkin – Leucadia EP (2019-03-22, self-released)

Songwriting

Made in Heights – Made in Heights

Made in Heights – Without My Enemy What Would I Do

Co-wrote and featured on producer Rahki's "Perfect Words" for artist Thurz

Co-wrote and featured on Kero One's "Princess Diamond," which was also remixed by Starro

References

American women singer-songwriters
1985 births
Living people
21st-century American women singers